Anthony Ammirati (born 16 July 2003) is a French athlete who specializes in pole vaulting. He was the gold medallist at the World Athletics U20 Championships in 2022.

Career 
In June 2021, he sets a new national record under-20 with 5,72m in Salon-de-Provence..The following month, he wins the gold medal at the U20 European championships in Tallinn with a jump of 5,64m.

During the U20 world championships in Cali, he becomes world champion with a jump of 5,65m at his second attempt. He then improves his personal best with 5,75m. 

On August 31, 2022, he broke the French junior pole vault record for the third time in Sankt-Wendel with a jump of 5.81 m. He becomes the second performer in the history of the category behind Armand Duplantis, author of 6.05 m in 2018.

Records

References

2003 births
Living people
French male pole vaulters
World Athletics U20 Championships winners